Istrinsky District is an administrative and municipal district (raion), one of the thirty-six in Moscow Oblast, Russia. It is located in the western central part of the oblast. Its administrative center is the town of Istra. Population:  115,753 (2002 Census);  The population of Istra accounts for 29.3% of the district's total population.

Geography
The Istra River flows through the district.

References

Notes

Sources

Districts of Moscow Oblast
